The First Baptist Church in the City of New York is a Baptist church based in a sanctuary built in 1890–93 at the intersection of Broadway and West 79th Street in the Upper West Side of Manhattan, New York City. The church is affiliated with the Southern Baptist Convention.

History

Early attempts to form a Baptist church in Flushing, Queens were organized by William Wickenden and others in the 1650s.

In 1745, Jeremiah Dodge settled in New York City, and began holding prayer meetings in his home. He was a member of the Fishkill Baptist Church. When he learned of Benjamin Miller at nearby Scotch Plains Baptist Church in Scotch Plains, New Jersey, he asked him to come and hold preaching services at the prayer meetings, which he did. Other ministers preached to this group from time to time, and in 1753, all thirteen of them joined the Scotch Plains Baptist Church after Miller had baptized some of them. They were organized as an independent Baptist church on June 19, 1762 by Benjamin Miller and John Gano – the latter being called as Pastor – and took the name "First Baptist Church in the City of New York".  Gano served as pastor until 1776 when he became Chaplain in General Washington's American Army. The congregation's first sanctuary was at 35 Gold Street in Lower Manhattan, built in 1759–60.

Early 19th century

From 1801–02, the First Baptist Church built a new stone structure at its site on Gold Street. During the period they were located there, the congregation's "inhospitality" to African-Americans provoked the founding of the Abyssinian Baptist Church.

Under the leadership of Dr. Spencer Cone, the congregation relocated in 1842 to a Gothic revival structure at 354 Broome Street at the intersection of Elizabeth Street. This was also the headquarters of the Baptist Home and Foreign Mission Board.  This sanctuary is still in use today by the Evangelical Lutheran Church of St. Matthew.

Sanctuary at Broadway and 79th Street
The First Baptist Church relocated to the present facility in 1890. It occupies a site that, because of a bend in the direction of Broadway, is prominent from a distance down the avenue. The building is set at an angle of 45 degrees to the street grid.

In the sanctuary, the Hebrew text is the essence of Genesis 1:1, "In the beginning, God..." The Greek text is the essence of John 1:1, "In the beginning was the Word (Jesus Christ)." In the upper right are the Greek symbols of Alpha and Omega, the first and last letters of the Greek alphabet. Jesus refers to Himself as the Alpha and Omega in Revelation 1:8 and 22:13. In the upper left are the Greek characters pi and chi. This may stand for Pater and Christos, Father and Christ.

References
Notes

Bibliography
Haldeman, Isaac Massey. Ten Sermons on the Second Coming of Our Lord Jesus Christ Fleming H. Revell Company, 1916.
Mindlin, Alex. "With Bowed Heads, A Flock Looks Warily Ahead" The New York Times (October 29, 2006)

External links

Official website

Baptist churches in New York City
General Association of Regular Baptist Churches
1762 establishments in the Province of New York
Upper West Side
Religious organizations established in 1762
Churches in Manhattan
18th-century Baptist churches in the United States
Broadway (Manhattan)
19th-century Baptist churches in the United States